Glen MacLeod Cochrane (born January 29, 1958) is a Canadian former professional ice hockey defenceman who played ten seasons in the National Hockey League (NHL) for the Philadelphia Flyers, Vancouver Canucks, Chicago Black Hawks and Edmonton Oilers. He was best known for his time with the Flyers, providing toughness and carrying on the tough Flyer tradition embodied by the likes of Dave Schultz and Dave Brown. Cochrane was born in Cranbrook, British Columbia, but grew up in Kamloops, British Columbia.

Currently, Cochrane is a scout of the Anaheim Ducks.

Career statistics

External links
 
Profile at HockeyDraftCentral

1958 births
Living people
Anaheim Ducks scouts
Calgary Centennials players
Canadian ice hockey defencemen
Chicago Blackhawks players
Colorado Avalanche scouts
Edmonton Oilers players
Hershey Bears players
Ice hockey people from British Columbia
Maine Mariners players
Sportspeople from Cranbrook, British Columbia
Philadelphia Flyers draft picks
Philadelphia Flyers players
Pincher Creek Panthers players
Sportspeople from Kamloops
Vancouver Canucks players
Victoria Cougars (WHL) players